Gustavo Fernández and Shingo Kunieda defeated the defending champions Alfie Hewett and Gordon Reid in the final, 6–3, 6–1 to win the gentlemen's doubles wheelchair tennis title at the 2022 Wimbledon Championships. Fernandez and Kunieda's victory ended Hewett and Reid's streak of ten consecutive major titles.

Seeds

Draw

Finals

References

Sources
 Entry List
 Draw

Men's Wheelchair Doubles
Wimbledon Championship by year – Wheelchair men's doubles